The Rachiș is a left tributary of the river Aiud in Romania. It flows into the Aiud in Poiana Aiudului.

References

Rivers of Romania
Rivers of Alba County